Thomas Watson may refer to:

Bishops
Thomas Watson (bishop of Lincoln) (1515–1584), Catholic bishop
Thomas Watson (bishop of St David's) (1637–1717), English clergyman

Writers
Thomas Watson (poet) (c. 1557–1592), English poet and translator
Thomas Watson (Puritan) (c. 1620–1686), nonconformist preacher and writer
Tom Watson (journalist) (born 1962), journalist and author

Sportsmen
Tom Watson (golfer) (born 1949), American golfer
Tommy Watson (boxer) (1908–1971), English boxer
Tommy Watson (footballer, born 1943), Scottish football winger
Tommy Watson (footballer, born 1969), English football player
Tom Watson (footballer, born 1870) (1870–1902), English football goalkeeper for Small Heath
Tom Watson (footballer, born 1904), footballer for Rochdale
Tom Watson (footballer, born 1900) (1900–1978), Ireland international football player
Tom Watson (football manager) (1859–1915), English football manager
Tom Watson (Australian footballer) (1874–1920), Australian rules footballer
Tom Watson (fighter) (born 1982), mixed martial artist
Gordon Watson (footballer, born 1914) (Thomas Gordon Watson, 1914–2001), English footballer for Everton
Thomas Watson (cricketer, born 1880) (1880–1944), English clergyman and cricketer
Thomas Watson (cricketer, born 1913) (1913–1994), English cricketer and educator

Politicians
Thomas Watson (silk spinner) (1823–1887), British politician; MP for Ilkeston, Derbyshire, 1885–1887
Thomas E. Watson (1856–1922), American politician; Populist leader; U.S. Senator from Georgia
Thomas Philip Watson (1933–2015), American politician; Oklahoma State Senator
Thomas R. Watson (born 1947), American politician; Maine state representative
Thomas Watson, 3rd Earl of Rockingham (1715–1746), English nobleman and politician; MP for Canterbury
Thomas Watson (Berwick-upon-Tweed MP) (c. 1701–1766), British politician; MP for Berwick-upon-Tweed, 1754–1765
J. Thomas Watson (1885–1954), Attorney General of Florida
Tom Watson, Baron Watson of Wyre Forest (born 1967), British politician; former Deputy Leader of the Labour Party; and former MP for West Bromwich East

Businesspeople
Thomas J. Watson (1874–1956), first president of IBM
Thomas W. Watson, co-founder and former Vice Chairman of Omnicom Group, Inc.
Thomas J. Watson Jr. (1914–1993), second president of IBM and son of Thomas J. Watson

Artists
Thomas Watson (engraver) (1750–1781), fine engraver
T. H. Watson (Thomas Henry Watson, 1839–1913), British architect
Thomas Lennox Watson (1850–1920), Scottish architect and interior designer
Tom Watson (actor) (1932–2001), Scottish-born stage, television and film actor
Yannima Tommy Watson (c. 1935–2017), Australian artist

Others
 Thomas A. Watson (1854–1934), inventor and assistant to Alexander Graham Bell, notably in the invention of the telephone
 Tom Watson (musician) (born 1962), American guitarist
 Thomas E. Watson (USMC) (1892–1966), U.S. Marine Corps general
 Thomas Watson (surveyor), early Western Australian surveyor
 Thomas Watson (trade unionist) (1860s–1921), British trade union leader
 Thomas Colclough Watson (1867–1917), British recipient of the Victoria Cross
 Thomas Watson (physician) (1792-1882), British physician and president of the Royal College of Physicians, 1862–66